George Hope (12 September 1891 – 13 October 1964) was an  Australian rules footballer who played with Geelong in the Victorian Football League (VFL).

Notes

External links 

1891 births
1964 deaths
Australian rules footballers from Victoria (Australia)
Geelong Football Club players